Sicyos is a flowering plant genus of the family Cucurbitaceae. Members of the genus are commonly known as burr cucumbers.

Selected species

Out of 130 species which have been attributed to the genus, just 37 are currently accepted by botanists.

Formerly placed here
 Blastania garcini (Burm.f.) Cogn. (as S. garcini Burm.f.)
 Cissus trifoliata (L.) L. (as S. trifoliatus L.)
 Echinocystis lobata (Michx.) Torr. & A.Gray (as S. lobatus Michx.)
 Marah oregana (Torr. & A.Gray) Howell (as S. oreganus Torr. & A.Gray)
 Sechiopsis triquetra (Moc. & Sessé ex Ser.) Naudin (as S. triqueter Moc. & Sessé ex Ser.)
 Sechium edule (Jacq.) Sw. (as S. edulis Jacq.)

References

External links

 New Zealand Plant Conservation Network, Sicyos australis sensu lato. Accessed 2010-10-04.

Cucurbitaceae genera
Cucurbitoideae